Meet the Lees (originally titled Fortune Cookies) is an upcoming British family comedy film written and directed by Brenda Lee in her feature film debut.

Cast

Production
Brenda Lee's Fortune Cookies, inspired by her own 1990s upbringing and family's takeout restaurant, was originally in development in 2011 and 2012 with Reelscape Films and a different cast including Elaine Tan and David Yip, but the project did not come into fruition at the time.

Casting began in October 2019. Produced by Screen Northants with support from BBC Children in Need, principal photography took place on location in Northampton in early 2020. Filming locations included Golden Hill in Kingsthorpe among other Chinese takeaway restaurants, the Guild Hall, the Racecourse, Royal & Derngate, The Deco, and Northampton International Academy.

Release
A teaser was first revealed in August 2020. Preview screenings were held at Cineworld Sixfields in Northampton on 31 January 2022 and at the Prince Charles Cinema in central London on 1 February. The film is being distributed by Phoenix Worldwide Entertainment.

References

External links

Upcoming films
British Chinese films
British comedy films
Entertainment in Northampton
Films postponed due to the COVID-19 pandemic
Films set in 1997
Films shot in England